As of 2018, the Dallas Cowboys' flagship radio station is KRLD-FM owned by Entercom.

Brad Sham is the team's longtime play-by-play voice. Working alongside him is former Cowboy quarterback Babe Laufenberg. The Cowboys, who retain rights to all announcers, chose not to renew Laufenberg's contract in 2006 and brought in former safety Charlie Waters. However, Laufenberg did work as the analyst on the "Blue Star Network," which televises Cowboys preseason games not shown on national networks. The anchor station is KTVT, the CBS owned and operated station in Dallas. Previous stations which aired Cowboys games included KTCK (AM), KVIL-FM, KRLD, and KLUV-FM. Kristi Scales is the sideline reporter on the radio broadcasts.

During his tenure as Cowboys coach, Tom Landry co-hosted his own coach's show with late veteran sportscaster Frank Glieber and later with Brad Sham. Landry's show was famous for his analysis of raw game footage and for he and his co-host making their NFL "predictions" at the end of each show. Glieber is one of the original voices of the Cowboys Radio Network, along with Bill Mercer, famous for calling the Ice Bowl of 1967 and both Super Bowl V and VI. Mercer is perhaps best known as the ringside commentator of World Class Championship Wrestling in the 1980s. Upon Mercer's departure, Verne Lundquist joined the network, and became their play-by-play announcer by 1977, serving eight years in that capacity before handing those chores permanently over to Brad Sham, who joined the network in 1977 as the color analyst and occasional fill-in for Lundquist.

Longtime WFAA-TV sports anchor Dale Hansen was the Cowboys' color analyst with Brad Sham as the play-by-play announcer from 1985-94. Dave Garrett succeeded Sham on play-by-play in 1995, teaming with Hansen (1995–96), Laufenberg (1996–97), and Mike Doocy (1997). Sham returned as the team's play-by-play voice in 1998.

In 1984 and 2001, the Cowboys used guest analysts in the radio booth for each game. In 1984, Dale Hansen, Charlie Waters, Roger Staubach, Cliff Harris, Verne Lundquist, Drew Pearson, Frank Glieber, and Bob Lilly were guest analysts. In 2001, guest analysts included Charlie Waters, Irving Fryar, Roger Staubach, Troy Aikman, Dan Rather, Michael Irvin, Preston Pearson, John Madden, Pat Summerall, and Dale Hansen.

Cowboys radio announcers

 
Dallas Cowboys
broadcasters
CBS Radio Sports